Məşədilər (also, Meshadlyar and Meshadilyar) is a village and municipality in the Tovuz Rayon of Azerbaijan.

References 

Populated places in Tovuz District